Kalaram mandir is a temple in Nashik of Nashik district in Maharashtra, its deity is Shri Ram. It is a famous mandir situated in Panchavati area of the Nashik.

The temple derives its name from a black statue of Lord Rama. The literal translation of kalaram is "black Rama". The sanctum sanctorum also houses the statues of the goddess Sita and the god Lakshmana. Thousands of devotees visit the temple every day.

History 

The original temple of Lord Rama was very old, estimated to be of the Rashtrakuta Period from 7th to 11th centuries. However, antiquity of the Rama idol threw light on the fact that it was more than 2000 years old. The original temple was destroyed by Muslim rulers and it remained in demolished condition. However, during the first Islamic attack on the Temple, the idol of Lord was thrown in the Godavari River by the Temple Brahmins in order to save it. The new temple was funded by Sardar Rangarao Odhekar, and was rebuilt around 1788. Once, Odhekar had a dream that the statue of Rama in black colour was in the Godavari River.He carried out expedition of reviving the idol and miraculously got it.  Odhekar took the statue from river and built the temple. Odhekar's expedition is an important part of Nashik's history. There is a statue of Sardar Odhekar in the temple.

According to ancient epic of the Ramayana, Lord Rama was sent in exile for fourteen years. After the tenth year of exile, Lord Rama along with Lakshman and Seeta, lived for two and half years on the northern bank of the Godavari near Nasik. This place is known as Panchavati.

B.R. Ambedkar's satyagraha
The temple came middle of the conflict caused by Satyagraha organised and led by B.R. Ambedkar. Now it is known as Kalaram mandir satyagraha. Ambedkar organised a large protest outside this temple on 2 March 1930, in order to enter into the temple. Many dalit protesters arrived to the town by trucks, they surrounded the temple and sat arround it. They sang songs, often raised war cries, demanded to enter in the mandir. The people of Nashik boycotted the protesters. On the day of Rama Navami 9 April 1930,  the dalit protesters tried to stop the temple Rath yatra due to it fights, stone pelting began inbetween Hindus and dalit protesters, later Ambedkar reached at the riot spot, he and other all the protesters suffered minor injuries. Somehow a protester named Bhaskar Kendre broke the police cordon who were protecting the temple and enter in it and fell on the floor. This satyagraha ran till 1935.

Temple complex

The main entrance has a Lord Hanuman deity which is black. There is also a very old tree that has Lord Dattatreya's footprint impressions marked on a stone. Pilgrims visit the Kapaleshwar Mahadev temple near the Kalaram Temple.

Lord Hanuman's temple is designed in such a way that, Lord Ram's idol can be visible from Lord Hanuman's idol.

Main temple of Ram has 14 steps, which represents 14 years of Ram's exile.

Also, the temple has 84 pillars, which represents cycle of 84 lakh species one has to go in order to get Human birth.

References

External links
 

Hindu pilgrimage sites in India
18th-century Hindu temples
Hindu temples in Maharashtra
Tourist attractions in Nashik
Rama temples
Buildings and structures in Nashik